In physics, a number of noted theories of the motion of objects have developed. Among the best known are:
 Classical mechanics
 Newton's laws of motion
 Euler's laws of motion
 Cauchy's equations of motion
 Kepler's laws of planetary motion 
 General relativity
 Special relativity
 Quantum mechanics

Motion (physics)